Flörke is a German surname. Notable people with the surname include:

Heinrich Gustav Flörke (1764–1835), German botanist and lichenologist
Hermann Flörke (1893–1979), German Wehrmacht army general
Randy Florke, American real estate and design executive

German-language surnames